Aric Rindfleisch (born 28 October 1965), is an American marketing author and professor. He is the Executive Director of the Illinois MakerLab at University of Illinois at Urbana–Champaign, and John M. Jones Professor of Marketing. He was included in "The Best 300 Professors" list compiled by The Princeton Review in 2012. Rindfleisch is a former executive at the advertising agency J. Walter Thompson. In 2015 he started a course on digital marketing at Coursera. He also served as an officer in the US Army Reserve for 14 years.

Research 
Rindfleisch has been exploring the theme of brand loyalty and materialism in various studies. In 2006, he conducted with 2 colleagues a study which established the concept of the doppelganger brand image. He is also known for promoting advanced technologies like 3D printing. His current research focuses on collaborative innovation, customer co-creation, and the maker movement. Over the past three years, he has been heavily involved in the 3D printing community and built an early MakerBot Cupcake in 2010.

Teaching 
Rindfleisch teaches two courses in the iMBA program offered by the Gies College of Business at the University of Illinois at Urbana-Champaign and is also the instructor in an online course, "Marketing in a Digital World", offered by Coursera and University of Illinois at Urbana-Champaign. Aric has a 4.84/5 rating (4,189 Ratings) as a teacher on Coursera  "Marketing in a Digital World" is one of the most popular courses on Coursera with over 250,000 Learners and is rated by Class Central as one of the Top 50 MOOCs of All Time.

Publications 
Rindfleisch, A., O'Hern, M., Sachdev, V. 2017. The Digital Revolution, 3D Printing, and Innovation as Data. Journal of Product Innovation Management, 34: 681-690
 Mahr, D., Rindfleisch, A., Slotegraaf, R. 2015. Enhancing Crowdsourcing Success: The Role of Creative and Deliberate Problem-Solving Styles. Customer Needs and Solutions, 209-221
 Wuyts, S., Rindfleisch, A., Citrin, A. 2015. Outsourcing Customer Support: The Role of Provider Customer Focus. Journal of Operations Management, 35: 40-55.

Honors and awards 
List of Teachers Ranked as Excellent, University of Illinois, 2014, 2016.
He was named by Princeton Review as one of “The Best 300 Professors” in America.

References

American business theorists
Living people
People from Farmington, Connecticut
University of Wisconsin–Madison alumni
Cornell University alumni
Central Connecticut State University alumni
1965 births